The 2017 Ohio State Buckeyes football team represented Ohio State University during the 2017 NCAA Division I FBS football season. The Buckeyes played their home games at Ohio Stadium in Columbus, Ohio. It was the Buckeyes' 128th overall, the 105th as a member of the Big Ten Conference, and fourth as a member of the Eastern Division. They were led by Urban Meyer, who was in his 6th season as head coach at the school.

Coming off a College Football Playoff appearance in 2016, the Buckeyes began the year ranked second in the preseason AP Poll and were the overwhelming favorites to win the Big Ten. In the second game of the year, they suffered their first loss at the hands of No. 5 Oklahoma in Columbus, whom Ohio State had beaten on the road the previous year. Ohio State won their following six games, including a 39–38 victory over No. 2 Penn State, but lost in a blowout on the road to Iowa the following week. The Buckeyes won their remaining regular season games and earned a spot in the 2017 Big Ten Championship Game by winning the East Division with an 8–1 conference record.

Ohio State would play then-undefeated No. 4 Wisconsin as a heavy favorite.  The Buckeyes would win in Indianapolis, causing the last-undefeated FBS team to incur a loss. There was huge controversy over the College Football Playoff committee as to who would get into the final four; Alabama, which didn't play in the SEC Championship, was given a spot over both the Buckeyes and Badgers, both of whom just missed out on a playoff spot. Ohio State instead received an invitation to the Cotton Bowl. They defeated USC in that bowl to end the season at 12–2 and ranked fifth in the final polls.

Ohio State was led on offense by quarterback J. T. Barrett, who was named first-team All-Big Ten. Barrett was both a passing and a running threat, finishing with 3,053 yards and a Big Ten-leading 35 touchdowns through the air, and 798 yards and 12 touchdowns on the ground. His 47 total touchdowns were second in FBS behind Baker Mayfield. Freshman running back J. K. Dobbins finished second in the Big Ten with 1,403 rushing yards. Center Billy Price was a consensus first-team All-American, as was cornerback Denzel Ward. Both players were selected in the first round of the 2018 NFL Draft; Price was awarded the Rimington Trophy as the nation's top center.

Spring Game
The 2017 LiFE Sports Spring Game took place in Columbus Ohio at 12:30pm on April 15, 2017.

Recruiting

Position key

Recruits

The Buckeyes signed a total of 21 recruits.

Schedule
The Buckeyes' 2017 schedule consisted of seven home games and 5 away games. Ohio State hosted all three of its non-conference games; against Oklahoma of the Big 12, against independent Army, and against UNLV of the Mountain West.

The Buckeyes played nine conference games; they hosted Maryland, Penn State, Michigan State, and Illinois. They traveled to Indiana, Rutgers, Nebraska, Iowa, and rival Michigan.

Sources:
1 – ESPN's College GameDay was held in Bloomington for the first time in the show's broadcast history.

Rankings

Game summaries

at Indiana

The No. 2 Ohio State Buckeyes went on the road for their first game of the season, a conference game against the Indiana Hoosiers at Memorial Stadium in Bloomington, Indiana. This marked the first time that the Buckeyes opened a season on the road since their 42–24 victory over Virginia Tech in 2015 and their first time opening with a Big Ten opponent since 1976 when they defeated Michigan State 49–21.

Ohio State began the game well, driving the ball 66 yards on 11 plays, but were stalled in the redzone, settling for a Sean Nuernberger field goal to take an early 3–0 lead. The Hoosiers answered with an 87-yard drive that was capped with an 18-yard touchdown pass from Richard Lagow to tight end Ian Thomas to take a four-point lead. The teams continued to trade punts until the second quarter when the Buckeyes' Jordan Fuller intercepted an Indiana pass in the endzone. Ohio State mounted a 58-yard drive that ended came up short at Indiana two-yard line that resulted in another Nuernberger field goal to bring the score to 7–6. Each team would score on touchdown drives of more than 75 yards on the next two possessions to give the Hoosiers a 14–13 lead at halftime.

The third quarter started off looking like it would continue to be a back-and-forth game as the teams again traded touchdowns, but the Buckeye passing offense, led by J. T. Barrett, threw touchdown passes to Parris Campbell for 74 yards and to Johnnie Dixon for 54 yard to give the Buckeyes a 35–21 lead. The Buckeye defense took over from there turning the Hoosiers over two times, each resulting in an Ohio State touchdown. The Buckeyes held on for the win, 49–21.

Two Buckeye records were set during the game: J. K. Dobbins broke Maurice Clarett's 2002 debut rushing performance of 175 yards by amassing 181 yards on the ground, and J. T. Barrett also moved onto the list of the most career offensive yards by a Buckeye with his 365-yard performance. Barrett was named co-Offensive Big Ten Player of the Week for the seventh time in his career and Dobbins was named Big Ten Freshman of the Week for their performances in week one.

Game Statistics

Game Leaders

No. 5 Oklahoma

The No. 2 Ohio State Buckeyes welcomed the No. 5 Oklahoma Sooners to Ohio Stadium in Columbus, Ohio in a top five match-up. College GameDay made their record 16th visit to Ohio State's campus and Ohio State's 39th appearance overall, which was their fourth consecutive. This was the fourth match-up between the historic programs.

During the first quarter, the Sooners moved the ball well by pushing into Buckeye territory on all three opening drives, but they failed to capitalize due to two fumbles and a failed fourth down conversion. The Buckeyes, on the other hand, began the game with two consecutive punts which resulted with the game scoreless at the end of the first. The first score came at 11:11 in the second with a 24-yard Sean Nuernberger field goal after the Buckeyes failed to convert inside of the redzone. Eight plays later, Oklahoma again failed to capitalize in Ohio State territory, this time missing a 37-yard field goal. Following a punt by the Buckeyes, Oklahoma was able to mount a 55-yard drive to kick a 35-yard field goal to tie the game 3–3 at the half.

The Buckeyes came out of the gates strong behind a 56-yard Parris Campbell kickoff return capped by 6-yard J. K. Dobbins touchdown, giving the Buckeyes a 10–3 lead. But, 1:47 seconds later, Baker Mayfield and the Oklahoma Sooners stuck back on a 36-yard Dimitri Flowers touchdown reception to tie the game at 10. Ohio State would never find the endzone again and would settle for two more Nuernberger field goals. However, Mayfield would lead the Sooners as he threw for 386 yards and three touchdowns in piling up the yards in the second half as the Buckeyes' offense struggled. A touchdown run by Jordan Smallwood capped the Sooner scoring as the Sooners won 31–16. Following the game, Mayfield planted the school's flag at mid-field while the team danced in celebration on the Ohio State logo. Mayfield would later apologize for the incident.

Ohio State (1–1, 1–0) would fall to No. 8 in the AP poll, while Oklahoma (2–0) would rise to No. 2.

Game Statistics

Game Leaders

Army

The No. 8 Ohio State Buckeyes (1–1, 1–0) took on the Army Black Knights (2–0) at Ohio Stadium in Columbus, Ohio. This was the Buckeyes first-ever match-up against the Black Knights and the seventh match-up against a military academy. Ohio State is 5–1 all-time against the other two major military academies with the most recent win coming in 2014 against Navy and the only loss coming in 1990 against Air Force.  
A week after seemingly nothing went right in a prime-time loss to Oklahoma, Ohio State couldn't have scripted a better start in its bounce-back attempt against Army. The Buckeyes purred on their first two drives, covering 75 and then 94 yards, to race to a 14–0 lead. Army limited the Buckeyes to one possession in the second quarter and outscored OSU to draw to 17–7. Army started the quarter with an 11-play drive that ended when Blake Wilson missed a 43-yard field-goal attempt. Finally getting the ball back in the second half, the Buckeyes wasted little time taking it to the end zone. J. K. Dobbins ripped off a 22-yard run on first down from the 26, then went 52 yards on a run around left end, a play in which the freshman juked Army cornerback Mike Reynolds almost into the ground. That made the score 24–7, and after Kendall Sheffield recovered a fumbled snap on Army's next drive, OSU went to the air to increase its lead. J. T. Barrett completed all three of his passes on the next drive, including a 31-yarder across the middle to tight end Marcus Baugh to move the ball to the 22. Two plays later, Barrett threw a fastball strike to Terry McLaurin, who headed downfield until he found an open spot in the end zone. With a 31–7 lead, the Buckeyes forced a three-and-out but couldn't put the game away and punted from inside Army territory late in the quarter. The Buckeyes were winning big on the scoreboard, and that continued to the end. Barrett's 9-yard touchdown pass to Austin Mack, which gave the senior quarterback the Big Ten record by accounting for his 107th career touchdown. Another three-and-out gave OSU the ball back with 4:36 remaining, and backup QB Dwayne Haskins guided the offense 72 yards before the time arrived for victory formation.

Game Statistics

Game Leaders

UNLV

The No. 10 Ohio State Buckeyes improved to 3–1 with a 54–21 win at Ohio Stadium over the UNLV Rebels, who fell to 1–2. The Buckeyes were led by quarterback J. T. Barrett, who threw 12 completions for 209 yards for 5 touchdowns in just one half before being replaced by Dwayne Haskins who threw for 228 yards and two touchdowns, but tarnished by one interception that was thrown for a Rebel touchdown. The Buckeye receivers accumulated seven touchdowns by seven different receivers, which is a Big Ten record.  The Rebels' highlights came on an 11-play, 83 yard drive at the end of the second quarter, a 55-yard Lexington Thomas run in the third quarter and a 65-yard interception return for a touchdown by Javin White in the fourth.

Game statistics

Game leaders

at Rutgers

The No. 11 Ohio State Buckeyes (4–1, 2–0) shut out divisional foe the Rutgers Scarlet Knights (1–4, 0–2) by a score of 56–0. This was the second consecutive year that the Buckeye's shut out the Scarlet Knights. In their four match-ups, the Buckeyes have outscored Rutgers by a score of 219–24. Ohio State was once again led by J. T. Barrett who became Ohio State's all-time leading  by throwing for 275 yards and 3 touchdowns. Mike Weber, who had been injured, scored his first three touchdowns of the year, capping off three 60+ yard drives. Additionally, Johnnie Dixon was on the receiving end of two of Barrett's passes and ended the day with 115 yards. Demario McCall had 138 all-purpose yards including a 48-yard touchdown run and a 35-yard touchdown pass from backup quarterback Dwayne Haskins. All but one of Rutgers' possessions ended in a punt or a turnover with the exception of a missed 32-yard field goal with 43 seconds left in the game.

Game Statistics

Game Leaders

Maryland

The No. 10 Ohio State Buckeyes (5–1, 3–0) defeated the Maryland Terrapins (3–2, 1–1) in a Big Ten East match-up. This was Ohio State's Homecoming game. The Buckeyes have continued their undefeated streak over the Terrapins by winning by an average of 39 points.

The heavily favored Buckeyes began the game with a 9-play, 70-yard drive, capped by a 1-yard J. T. Barrett touchdown run.  On the Terrapins first drive, Quarterback Max Bortenschlager, was hit from behind by DE Nick Bosa and fumbled the ball which was returned by LB Jerome Baker for a 20-yard touchdown to give the Buckeyes an early 14–0 lead. The Buckeyes' special teams woes began on the ensuing kickoff which was returned for a 100-yard touchdown by Ty Johnson to cut the Ohio State lead to 7. But, the Ohio State offense answered again by scoring an 8-yard touchdown pass from Barrett to Binjimen Victor. Following a botched PAT snap, the Buckeyes lead 20–7 at the end of the first quarter.

The Buckeyes' miscues began adding up at the beginning of the second quarter. Sean Nuernberger's 47-yard field goal was blocked, J. K. Dobbins fumbled and punter Drue Chrisman had a 22-yard punt giving Maryland great field position. Though the mistakes on special teams and offense added up, the defense kept the Maryland offense scoreless. In the final five minutes of the second half, Ohio State scored three consecutive touchdowns giving them a 41–7 halftime lead.

Maryland began the second half with a −14 yard drive that was followed by an Ohio State drive that ended with a missed 29-yard field goal attempt. The Ohio State offense recovered and scored touchdowns on three of their next four drives. Maryland's only offensive score of the day came after a Dwayne Haskins fumble at the Ohio State 27, which allowed for a four play drive, capped by a 20-yard Javon Leake run, making the final 62–14.

Ohio State finished the day with 584 total yards and held the Terrapins to only 66.

Game Statistics

Game Leaders

at Nebraska

The No. 9 Ohio State Buckeyes (6–1, 4–0) defeated the Nebraska Cornhuskers (3–4, 2–2) at Memorial Stadium in Lincoln, Nebraska, by a score of 56–14. This is the third consecutive defeat of their cross-divisional foe, with the last and only loss coming in 2011. Additionally, the win marked the Buckeye's 500th Big Ten Conference victory and moved them into a tie with the Cornhuskers for the third-most NCAA Division I Football Bowl Subdivision wins at 892.

The Buckeyes began the game on defense which forced a three-and-out. Following a 57-yard punt which pinned the Ohio State offense at their own 4-yard line, the Buckeye's drove 96 yards to score the game's first score that was capped by a 52-yard, J. K. Dobbins, touchdown.  After another three-and-out by the Silver Bullet defense, the offense again scored on another drive that ended with a J. T. Barrett touchdown run, giving the Buckeyes a 14–0 lead at the end of the opening quarter. Ohio State scored less than 90 seconds into the second quarter, increasing their lead to 21. The Nebraska offense showed very little in the first half, gaining only five first downs on their six possessions, and the defense struggled even more by failing to stop the Buckeyes from reaching the endzone on all five of their possessions. This gave Ohio State a 35–0 halftime lead.

Ohio State once again lead a 75-yard drive to open the second half but were quickly matched by a 77-yard Tanner Lee touchdown pass to J.D. Spielman, making the score 42–7 Ohio State. The Cornhuskers would once again score on their following possession, on another Tanner Lee pass, but the score was again matched on a 15-play, 66-yard, Ohio State scoring drive. Nebraska would fail to score again while Ohio State would score once more, making the final score 56–14. Ohio State would score on eight of their nine drives and never having to punt.

J. T. Barrett scored five passing touchdowns and two rushing touchdowns, which tied his record for most touchdowns responsible for that he set in 2016. For his performance, he was named the Big Ten Offensive Player of the Week for the eighth time in his career, the Davey O'Brien national quarterback of the week and the Earl Campbell Tyler Rose Award National Player of the Week.

The Buckeyes moved up to the No. 6 spot in both the AP Poll and Coaches Poll.

Game Statistics

Game Leaders

Penn State

The No. 6 Ohio State Buckeyes (7–1, 5–0) defeated the No. 2 Penn State Nittany Lions (7–1, 4–1) at Ohio Stadium by a score of 39–38. The Buckeyes avenged last year's loss to Penn State that gave them their only regular season loss and allowed the Nittany Lions to earn a berth over the Buckeyes in the 2016 Big Ten Football Championship Game. OSU Coach Urban Meyer is now 5–1 versus Penn State and PSU's James Franklin is 1–3 versus the Buckeyes. In all but three of the 32 match-ups, including 13 straight, at least one of the teams was ranked in the AP Top 25 poll. This game served as host to ESPN's College GameDay, and was Ohio State's third appearance this year and Penn State's second.

Special teams woes began immediately for the Buckeyes when Penn State won the opening coin toss and elected to receive the ball on the opening kickoff which resulted in a 97-yard Saquon Barkley kickoff return for a touchdown. On Ohio State's following possession, after only three plays, wide receiver Parris Campbell fumbled the ball after he was once again injured. This gave the Nittany Lion possession on their 23-yard line which led to an eventual 13-yard touchdown pass from Trace McSorley to DaeSean Hamilton.  The Buckeyes found themselves in a 14-point hole at the 11:34 mark of the first quarter. After trading punts, Ohio State finally got on the scoreboard following a 38-yard Sean Nuernberger field goal to make the score 3–14. The remainder of the first quarter remained fairly quiet.

The second quarter of the game began with an 81-yard Penn State drive that resulted in a 36-yard touchdown Barkley run to give Penn State an 18-point lead with a score of 3–21. J. T. Barrett and the Ohio State offense was able to match that score with their first touchdown of the game by driving 63 yards and scoring on a 14-yard pass from Barrett to Terry McLaurin. The Buckeyes once again faced a special teams disaster on the following kickoff which was returned for 59 yards by Koa Farmer to the Ohio State 23 yard line. Two plays later McSorley ran for a 6-yard touchdown to give the Nittany Lions a 28–10 lead. Fortunately for the Buckeyes, the offense was able to travel 75 yards and a 2-yard Mike Weber touchdown with less than five minutes in the half to cut the PSU lead to 17–28. Punts were traded by both teams to end the half and Penn State went to the locker room with an impressive 11-point lead.

The Buckeyes were able to amount a 57-yard drive following the intermission that resulted in a 36-yard Nuernberger field goal to get the lead to eight, but it was quickly negated ten plays later when McSorley found the endzone again on a 37-yard touchdown pass to DeAndre Thompkins. The third quarter had no more scoring and the Nittany Lions were able to secure a 20–35 lead going into the fourth and final quarter.

On the opening drive of the fourth quarter, Barrett fumbled the ball in a botched hand off attempt to J. K. Dobbins which gave the ball to the Nittany Lions on Ohio State's 42 yard line. The Buckeye defense stepped up and forced a three-and-out which was followed by a blocked punt by Denzel Ward. Two plays later Ohio State found the endzone on a 38-yard pass from Barrett to Johnnie Dixon, which would bring the Buckeyes within eight. Unfortunately for the Buckeyes, Penn State was able to pull back ahead by 11 on a 5:23 drive that ended in a 24-yard Tyler Davis field goal. Following the Penn State score, the Buckeye offense came alive and resulted in two 55+ yard drives that ended in Barrett touchdown passes. One to Dixon and the go-ahead touchdown to Marcus Baugh. Penn State on the other hand faced two consecutive possessions of negative yards, sealing the one-point Ohio State victory.

J. T. Barrett gained a school record 423 total offensive yards during the game earning him his ninth Big Ten Offensive Player of the Week honors, while wide receiver K. J. Hill caught 12 passes, which is the fourth most in program history. The Buckeye defense was able to hold Heisman Trophy hopeful Barkley to a season low of only 44 yards rushing on 21 attempts, but his performance on special teams earned him honors for Big Ten Special Team Player of the Week.

Ohio State moved up to No. 3 in both the AP and Coaches Polls while Penn State fell to No. 7 in both. The Buckeyes took over the sole lead of the Big Ten East division following the victory and a Michigan State loss to Northwestern.

at Iowa

The No. 6 Ohio State Buckeyes (7–2, 5–1) lost to the Iowa Hawkeyes (5–3, 2–3) in Iowa City, Iowa at Kinnick Stadium by a score of 55–24. This was the Buckeyes' first trip to Iowa since 2010 and the first time playing the Hawkeyes since 2013.

The first play of the game began a tough day for the Buckeyes when quarterback J. T. Barrett threw his first of four interceptions that was returned for an Iowa touchdown by Amani Hooker. The Buckeye offense looked to rebound by scoring two touchdowns and a field goal on their next three possessions. The Hawkeyes matched them by also scoring touchdowns on all but one of their first half drives. This gave Iowa a 31–17 lead at the half. The second half proved to be no easier on the Buckeyes as they allowed three more Iowa touchdowns and a field goal, while the Buckeyes offense only managed three first downs and one touchdown.

Ohio State fell to No. 11 in both the AP and the Coaches' Polls while falling to 13th in the CFP Poll. Iowa found themselves ranked for the first time in 2017 as they debuted at No. 25 in the AP Poll and No. 20 in the CFP Poll. The loss put the Buckeyes in a two-way tie at the top of the Big Ten East with their next opponent, Michigan State. Iowa quarterback, Nate Stanley, was named the Big Ten Offensive Player of the Week for his performance.

Game Statistics

Game Leaders

No. 12 Michigan State

The No. 13 Ohio State Buckeyes (8–2, 6–1) defeated the No. 12 Michigan State Spartans (7–3, 5–2) at Ohio Stadium by a score of 48–3. OSU coach Urban Meyer moved to 4–2 versus the Spartans, while MSU coach Mark Dantonio fell to 3–6 against the Buckeyes. With the victory, Ohio State became the sole possessors of first place in the Big Ten East.

While Michigan State started on a nine-play drive that took more than five minutes off of the clock, the Buckeyes were able to force a punt, a large part due to Nick Bosa's 12-yard sack on third down. The Buckeye offense was able to form an 86-yard drive that resulted in 79 rushing yards, including a 47-yard touchdown run by Mike Weber. J. T. Barrett was able to rush for two more touchdowns as well as pass for another to give them a 28–0 lead. The Buckeye's final score of the first half came on a Weber 82-yard run on their next to-last possession, while Michigan State was able to kick a field goal as time expired following a Barrett interception. The Buckeyes would lead 35–3 at halftime. Ohio State was able to find the endzone on the third play of the second half with a 48-yard pass from Barrett to Binjimen Victor, this would be the last touchdown of the game. Ohio State would kick two Sean Nuernberger field goals on their next two possessions to increase their lead to 45.

Before this game, the largest Dantonio-Meyer match-up spread had been a 12-point OSU victory. This result was the largest defeat in the series history.

The Buckeyes moved up three spots to No. 8 in both the AP and Coaches' polls and four spots to No. 9 in the CFP poll while Michigan State fell to No. 24 in the AP poll, No. 22 in the Coaches' poll and No. 17 in the CFP poll. Weber was named Big Ten co-Offensive Player of the Week for his 162-yard and two touchdown rushing performance.

Game Statistics

Game Leaders

Illinois

The No. 9 Ohio State Buckeyes (9–2, 7–1) defeated the Illinois Fighting Illini (2–9, 0–8) by a score of 52–14 to end their Big Ten West match ups for the 2017 regular season and clinch the Big Ten East title as well as a berth in the Big Ten Football Championship Game. Ohio State was awarded the Illibuck Trophy for the ninth consecutive time, which has been given out since 1925, making it the second oldest trophy between Big Ten football programs. Urban Meyer is now 5–0 against the Illini, while this was Illinois coach Lovie Smith's first game against the Buckeyes.

The Buckeye offense came out and struck quickly by scoring on their first drive by a 25-yard Mike Weber touchdown run. Ohio State's defense, matched the effort by forcing what would be the first of many three-and-outs. The following drive also resulted in a touchdown following a 6 play, 71-yard drive, capped by J. T. Barrett's ninth rushing touchdown of the season. Ohio State would go on to score two more touchdowns in the first quarter, one by a pass from Barrett to Binjimen Victor and the other by a 43-yard Weber run. Illinois would fail to convert a first down, giving the Buckeyes a 28–0 lead at the end of the first quarter.

Ohio State was able to add a 33-year Sean Nuernberger field goal at the beginning of the second period, followed soon after by another OSU drive that ended with a J. K. Dobbins touchdown run, which would be the last time the primary starters would see the game in the first half. Ohio State would fail to score on a drive for the first time during their last possession, while Illinois would gain their only first down of the opening half. Ohio State would go into halftime with a 38–0 lead as heavy rain began to fall.

Ohio State's defense mounted another three-and-out to start the second half, but the offense was apparently effected by the rain when back-up quarterback Dwayne Haskins fumbled the ball and it was returned 54-yards by Ahmari Hayes for Illinois' first score. Ohio State's offensive starters went back into the game but were forced to punt. Luckily for the Buckeyes, the punt was muffed and recovered by Ohio State that led to a Barrett touchdown pass to tight end Marcus Baugh. Ohio State led 45–7 at this point and would be the last time the offensive starters saw the field. The teams traded punts to close out the third quarter.

After a short performance by back-up quarterback, Joe Burrow, Haskins went back in the game which resulted in a 21-yard touchdown pass to Victor. The Illini would match the result with their only offensive touchdown on a 65-yard drive to make the score 52–14. Neither team would score again to make that the final.

Ohio State would only allow three first downs and it was the sixth game of the season that they allowed less than 100 rushing yards and the fifth game they allowed less than 100 passing yards.

Game Statistics

Game Leaders

at Michigan

The 114th edition of the Michigan–Ohio State football rivalry, colloquially known as "The Game", took place at Michigan Stadium between the No. 9 Ohio State Buckeyes (10–2, 8–1) and the Michigan Wolverines (8–4, 5–4).  The No. 9 Ohio State Buckeyes defeated the Michigan Wolverines by a score of 31–20.

Ohio State and Michigan both started off slowly by forcing three-and-outs on each team's opening drive before the Wolverines mounted a nearly six minute, 13-play, 77-yard drive that resulted in a touchdown. Ohio State was again forced with another three-and-out that was followed by a Michigan drive that ended in a punt that pinned the Buckeye's deep. Ohio State was forced to punt and was returned 42-yards by Michigan wide receiver Donovan Peoples-Jones, additionally, Ohio State committed a block in the back which gave the Wolverines the ball at the five-yard line. Michigan was able to take a 14–0 lead when quarterback John O'Korn completed a three-yard pass to Sean McKeon. Ohio State was held to −6 yard in the first quarter and was the first time since 2010 that Ohio State had been held to negative yardage in a quarter. The Ohio State offense and the rushing attack of J. T. Barrett and J. K. Dobbins came alive on the following drive when the two gained 71 yards on the ground that ended with a 21-yard Barrett touchdown run. Following a Michigan punt, Ohio State was able to move the ball again behind Barrett when he ran for 26 yards and threw a 25-yard touchdown pass to tight end Marcus Baugh, tying the game at 14. Neither team would score again in the first half.

Ohio State again started off slow by being forced to consecutive three-and-outs, while Michigan was able to score on a 2-yard Karan Higdon touchdown run. Ohio State linebacker, Chris Worley, was able to block the PAT and Michigan led 20–14. The Buckeyes answered back when Ohio State mounted a 78-yard touchdown drive capped by a 1-yard Dobbins touchdown run. Unfortunately for the Buckeyes, Barrett was injured during the drive and was forced out for the remainder of the game. RS Freshman, Dwayne Haskins gained 24 yards on the ground and 31 in the air on the drive that gave the Buckeyes a one-point, 21–20 lead. The Wolverines were unable to capitalize on the following possession and Ohio State was able to tack on a 44-yard Sean Nuernberger field goal, increasing the lead to four.  Michigan drove the ball 36-yards on their next possession, but turned the ball over on downs following an O'Korn sack and two additional incomplete passes. The Buckeyes drove again and Nuernberger missed only his third field goal of the season on a 43-yard attempt. The following play, O'Korn committed the only turnover of the game when he threw an interception to Jordan Fuller. On Ohio State's next possession, Dobbins ran for 41 yards and Mike Weber was able to seal the game by scoring a 25-yard touchdown run with 1:44 remaining in the game, to make what would be the final score, 31–20.

Michigan coach Jim Harbaugh dropped to 0–3 versus the Buckeyes, while Urban Meyer moved to 6–0 against the Wolverines. The current winning streak is tied for the second-longest in the series and tied for the longest for Ohio State with the 2004–2009 games. J. T. Barrett became the only quarterback in the series history to have four wins versus the other and moved Ohio State into first place in the number of all-time Big Ten wins. Ohio State clinched their first outright divisional title since 2014 and faced Wisconsin in the Big Ten Championship Game. Ohio State's ranking would remain unchanged in the AP Poll at No. 8 and they would move up one spot to No. 7 in the Coaches Poll.

Game Statistics

Game Leaders

vs. No. 3 Wisconsin (Big Ten Championship)

The No. 8 Ohio State Buckeyes (11–2, 8–1) defeated the No. 3 Wisconsin Badgers (12–1, 9–0) 27–21 at Lucas Oil Stadium in the Big Ten Championship. Urban Meyer is now 5–0 versus the Badgers, with two of the victories coming in overtime. Paul Chryst fell to 0–2 versus the Buckeyes. This was Ohio State's third appearance in the Championship game and Wisconsin's fifth, including their second straight.

The Badgers began the game with the ball and were forced to punt after a three-and-out with the reverse result happening on the Buckeyes' first possession as well. Wisconsin would then follow with a 55-yard drive that ended with an interception in Wisconsin's redzone thrown by Alex Hornibrook to Denzel Ward at OSU's 4-yard line. J. T. Barrett would rush for a total of 12 yards before hitting Terry McLaurin for an 84-yard touchdown pass giving the Buckeyes an early 7–0 lead. The pass from Barrett to McLaurin was the longest play committed against the Badgers' defense all season. The following Wisconsin drive lasted for 7 plays and 44 yards and a punt trapped the Buckeyes on their own two-yard line. Barrett would go on to throw an interception to Wisconsin linebacker Andrew Van Ginkel that was returned for a touchdown, tying the game at 7–7. Ohio State would bounce back quickly and score on a Barrett to Parris Campbell, 57-yard touchdown pass, once again regaining the lead 14–7 and bringing an end to the first quarter.

Ohio State wand Wisconsin traded punts to open the second quarter, but the Buckeyes would strike again with a Barrett 1-yard touchdown run that was set up by a 77-yard rush by J. K. Dobbins.  On Ohio State's second possession of the second quarter, Mike Weber would commit his first fumble of the year that was recovered by Van Ginkel that would lead to a 28-yard field goal, making the score 21–10 in favor of the Buckeyes. Ohio State would attempt to add to their lead, but Sean Nuernberger's 43-yard field goal was blocked as time expired.

While Ohio State couldn't amount a drive to open the second half, Wisconsin was able to convert a 46-yard field goal to narrow the lead to 8, which was quickly matched by the Buckeyes thanks to a 53-yard Dobbins run and a 27-yard Nuernberger field goal. Punts were traded after several three-and-outs both teams until Wisconsin began an 11-play, 52-yard drive that started with a Barrett interception that ended with a 1-yard touchdown run by Chris James and a successful 2-point conversion. The score narrowed to 24–21 favoring Ohio State. The Buckeyes followed with a 15-play drive that took 5:20 off the clock and tacked on a 20-yard Ohio State field goal to increase the lead back to 6. The Buckeyes and the Badgers again traded punts and with 1:50 left in the game, Wisconsin would begin their final offensive drive. Wisconsin would secure two first downs bringing them to mid-field. A holding penalty on Wisconsin on first down would force a first and 20. Hornibrook would throw three incomplete passes until he threw an interception to Damon Webb. Ohio State was able to run out the clock and secure their 36th Big Ten Title.

J. K. Dobbins would be named the MVP of the game which was the first time a Freshman earned the award. He would also become the all-time leading Freshman rusher in Ohio State history, passing Maurice Clarett. Ohio State would go on to be ranked No. 5 in the final CFP poll and miss the playoffs while Wisconsin would fall to No. 6. It was announced on December 3, that No. 5 Ohio State would face No. 8 USC in the Cotton Bowl Classic.

Game Statistics

Game Leaders

vs. No. 8 USC (Cotton Bowl Classic)

The No. 5 Ohio State Buckeyes (12–2) defeated the No. 8 USC Trojans (11–3) 24–7  at AT&T Stadium in  Arlington, Texas in the Cotton Bowl Classic. This was the first time that the Buckeyes defeated the Trojans since 1974, which broke a seven-game USC win-streak.

Ohio State and their Silver Bullet defense proved to be a tough match for USC. On the third play of the game, Ohio State's Kendall Sheffield was able to strip the ball from USC wide receiver Deontay Burnett which was recovered and advanced 20 yards by Ohio State's Damon Webb. This set up a short five-play drive that resulted in a J. T. Barrett 1-yard touchdown run. Punts were traded a few times by both teams until the Buckeyes produced an 83-yard drive that tacked on a 26-yard Sean Nuernberger field goal at the beginning of the second quarter to five OSU a 10–0 lead. The following play, Sam Darnold threw an interception to Ohio State's Damon Webb which was returned for a 23-yard touchdown giving the Buckeyes a 17–0 lead. Again, both teams traded punts and USC fumbled the ball which set up a 59-yard Buckeye drive that ended with a 28-yard Barrett touchdown run giving the Buckeyes a 24-point lead. USC was able to find the scoreboard in the second quarter when K. J. Hill fumbled a punt return which set up a 15-yard drive, capped by a one-yard Ronald Jones II touchdown run.  The score at half would be 24–7 favoring Ohio State.

Offensively, the Buckeyes remained quiet the second half by having all but one drive ending in a punt. USC was able to  drive deep into Buckeye territory three times, but a missed field goal, a fumble and a failed fourth-down conversion didn't allow the Trojans to score any points. The final score would end as 24–7.

Barrett and Webb were named the Offensive and Defensive MVPs respectively. Barrett also passed Drew Brees for the Big Ten record of most offensive yards in a career.

Game Statistics

Game Leaders

Early departures
 WR Noah Brown – Declared for the NFL Draft
 CB Gareon Conley – Declared for the NFL Draft
 FS Malik Hooker – Declared for the NFL Draft
 CB Marshon Lattimore – Declared for the NFL Draft
 LB Raekwon McMillan – Declared for the NFL Draft
 RB Curtis Samuel – Declared for the NFL Draft

Roster

Depth chart

Coaching changes
 OC/OL Ed Warriner left to become offensive line coach at Minnesota
 Co-OC/QB Tim Beck left to become the offensive coordinator at Texas under coach Tom Herman, a previous offensive coordinator at Ohio State
 Co-DC/LB Luke Fickell left to become the head coach at Cincinnati; Co-DC Greg Schiano then became the sole Defensive Coordinator
 Kevin Wilson, former Indiana head coach, hired as offensive coordinator and tight ends coach
 Ryan Day hired as quarterbacks coach and co-offensive coordinator
 Bill Davis hired as linebackers coach

Awards and honors 

*The NCAA and Ohio State only recognize the AP, AFCA, FWAA, Sporting News and WCFF All-American teams to determine if a player is a Consensus or Unanimous All-American. To be named a Consensus All-American, a player must be named first team in three polls and to be Unanimous, they must be named first team in all five.

Players in the 2018 NFL Draft

References

Ohio State
Ohio State Buckeyes football seasons
Big Ten Conference football champion seasons
Cotton Bowl Classic champion seasons
Ohio State Buckeyes football